The Imam Mahdi Mosque is a mosque located in Kuwait City, the capital of Kuwait. It was built in 1995.

See also
 List of mosques in Kuwait
 Islam in Kuwait

References

1995 establishments in Kuwait
Buildings and structures in Kuwait City
Mosques completed in 1995
Shia mosques in Kuwait